Scarboro is a residential neighbourhood in the southwest quadrant of Calgary, Alberta. It is located in the inner city, between Bow Trail, 24th Street West and 14th St West.   Its north-south boundaries are 12th Avenue South and 17th Avenue South. The community is bisected by the Crowchild Trail freeway.

The community consists of Scarboro proper, located on Scarboro Hill, consisting mostly of detached homes, and Upper Scarboro (officially called Scarboro/Sunalta West) which consists of the remaining small residential area west of Crowchild Trail.

Demographics

It is represented in the Calgary City Council by the Ward 8 councillor, on a provincial level by Calgary-Currie MLA Nicholas Milliken, and at federal level by Calgary Centre MP Greg McLean.

Scarboro is a well established and relatively wealthy neighbourhood, with the median household income of $79,948 (2000), and 7.5% low-income residents. As of 2000, 20.6% of the residents were immigrants. While the City of Calgary profile on Scarboro details a proportion of 27.3% of the buildings were condominiums or apartments, and 29.5% of the housing was used for renting, the actual neighbourhood consists of approximately 365 single-family dwellings. All are zoned R-1 and there are no multifamily residences or condominiums or apartments within Scarboro.

Education
The community is served by Sunalta Elementary public school and Sacred Heart Elementary (also publicly funded.)

See also
List of neighbourhoods in Calgary

References

Neighbourhoods in Calgary